Kirkland McCarty (born October 12, 1995) is an American professional baseball pitcher for the SSG Landers of the KBO League. He has played in Major League Baseball (MLB) for the Cleveland Guardians.

High school and college
McCarty went to Oak Grove High School in Hattiesburg, Mississippi, where he played baseball. He was an effective hitter and pitcher in high school, as he hit to a .364 batting average and pitched to a 25–3 record in his high school career. He committed to Southern Miss to play college baseball before the 2015 college baseball season. McCarty worked as both a starter and reliever as a freshman, compiling a 4–1 record and a 4.09 earned run average. Starting with his sophomore season, he played with future Guardians teammate Nick Sandlin. McCarty recorded an 8–1 record and a 3.16 ERA, while leading the Southern Miss team in strikeouts with 89. After his sophomore season, he played summer Baseball for the Orleans Firebirds of the Cape Cod League, throwing for a 2–1 record with a 1.99 ERA. He became solely a starter for his junior season, pitching to a 3.52 ERA, a 10–2 record, and 103 strikeouts across 17 starts.

Career

Cleveland Indians/Guardians
McCarty was drafted by the Cleveland Indians with the 222nd overall pick in the 7th round of the 2017 Major League Baseball draft.

McCarty signed for a $250,000 signing bonus on June 24, 2017, forgoing his senior season at Southern Miss. He pitched for the Mahoning Valley Scrappers during the rest of 2017, going 2–2 with an earned run average of 1.85 while working as both a starter and a reliever. He pitched for the Lake County Captains and the Lynchburg Hillcats in 2018, becoming a fulltime starter. He pitched to a 5–11 record and a 4.06 earned run average across  innings for both teams. For Lynchburg in 2019, he pitched to a 3–7 record with a 5.66 earned run average across 13 starts. He pitched for the Mesa Solar Sox in the Arizona Fall League after the minor league season was over.

He did not play a minor league game in 2020 due to the cancellation of the minor league season caused by the COVID-19 pandemic. He spent the 2021 season with the Triple-A Columbus Clippers. After beginning the 2022 season with Columbus, the Guardians selected McCarty's contract as a COVID-19 replacement player on April 20, 2022. He made his major league debut on April 24, 2022, and was returned to the minor leagues the following day. The Guardians selected McCarty's contract once more on May 8, 2022.

McCarty was designated for assignment by the Guardians on July 3, 2022.

Baltimore Orioles
On July 6, 2022, McCarty was claimed off waivers by the Baltimore Orioles and optioned to the Triple-A Norfolk Tides. He was designated for assignment on July 12, 2022 without making an appearance for the Orioles.

Cleveland Guardians (second stint)
On July 14, 2022, McCarty was claimed off waivers by the Cleveland Guardians. McCarty was designated for assignment once more on November 15, 2022, and subsequently released on November 17, 2022.

SSG Landers
On November 27, 2022, McCarty signed with the SSG Landers of the KBO League.

References

External links

1995 births
Living people
Sportspeople from Hattiesburg, Mississippi
Baseball players from Mississippi
Major League Baseball pitchers
Cleveland Guardians players
Southern Miss Golden Eagles baseball players
Orleans Firebirds players
Mahoning Valley Scrappers players
Lake County Captains players
Lynchburg Hillcats players
Columbus Clippers players
Mesa Solar Sox players